Paludicellidae is a family of bryozoans belonging to the order Ctenostomatida.

Genera:
 Alcyonella Lamarck, 1816
 Paludicella Gervais, 1836

References

Bryozoan families